William A. Guilford (5 February 1844 – c. October 1909) was a businessman and state legislator from Upson County, Georgia. Guilford was a representative to Georgia's constitutional congress in 1868 and was an elected representative in Georgia's assembly during the 1868–1870 term. He was a Republican. William Guilford's father, Guilford Speer, had operated a harness and shoe shop in Thomaston, Upson County, since at least the 1840s, and was a founding organizer of St. Mary's A.M.E. Church. William Guilford opened a barber shop in Thomaston, and was involved in organizing the county's annual Emancipation Day celebration, still observed on or about 19 May each year.

Guilford married a woman named Lourinda. Their known children included William (died before 1870), Guilford, Duffield, Lincoln, Douglass, Richard, Ludie, Benjamin, and Lidie (Lydia). He owned 12 acres of land in Thomaston, Georgia. Guilford was one of several witnesses on behalf of political activist William Fincher of Pike County, who was accused of vagrancy in 1868. The case was submitted to the U.S. Congress as an example of a violation of Civil Rights. The jury sentenced the man to a year of hard labor on the public roads.

Rufus B. Bullock, the provisional governor of Georgia filed documents in support of Guilford serving in the Georgia House of Representatives after the 1868 election when top vote getter J.C. Drake was disqualified.

References

People from Upson County, Georgia
1844 births
1909 deaths
Republican Party members of the Georgia House of Representatives
Businesspeople from Georgia (U.S. state)
African-American politicians during the Reconstruction Era
Original 33
Barbers
African-American state legislators in Georgia (U.S. state)
19th-century American businesspeople
20th-century African-American people